Soyer is a 2017 Polish drama and comedy film directed by Łukasz Barczyk.

Plot
The film is set in Łódź, Poland. The film's chief protagonist is a youngster named Soyer. His nickname derives from soya beans, the only food he permits himself to consume for his own well-being and that of other creatures. Soyer is described as either a "fool" or "a modern-day saint". His family treated him for mental disorders, although Soyer never considered himself ill-minded. Soyer considered himself Moses. After his mother went to the hospital, his care-taking became the responsibility of his sister, Małgośka and her husband, Janek Bryl, an ambitious banker. Soyer considered the couple's life to be overwhelmingly focused on the material world, whom he sets out to save them from, even against their own will.

Cast
 Cezary Kołacz as Janek Bryl
 Maciej Musiałowski as Konrad Sadko "Soyer"
 Marianna Zydek as Małgośka
 Diana Krupa as the waitress
 Kamil Wodka as the head waiter

References

2017 films
Polish comedy-drama films
2010s Polish-language films
2017 comedy-drama films